Rose Dieng-Kuntz (1956–2008) was a Senegalese computer scientist specializing in artificial intelligence. She was the first African woman to enroll in the École polytechnique.

Life and career
Her area of specialization for her PhD was the specification of parallelism. She worked for the National Institute for Research in Computer Science and Control (INRIA) in France, a French national research institution focusing on computer science, control theory and applied mathematics, where her research specialization was on the sharing of knowledge over the World Wide Web.

She died in 2008 after a long illness. Her death received national media coverage. France's Minister of Higher Education and Research, Valérie Pécresse, expressed sadness, and released a statement announcing the death of Rose Dieng Kuntz: "France and the world of science have just lost a visionary mind and an immense talent".

Her last research focused on knowledge management and the semantic Web. She was active in reaching out to students, and female students in particular, about her passion for science. In her words:

Awards and distinctions
 Irène Joliot-Curie Prize in 2005
 Chevalier de la Légion d’Honneur in 2006.

Publications (selected) 
  (ed., in collaboration with Heinz Jürgen Müller), Computational conflicts : conflict modeling for distributed intelligent systems, 2000
  Designing cooperative systems : the use of theories and models, 2000
  (ed., in collaboration with Nada Mata), Knowledge management and organizational memories, 2002
  (ed., in collaboration with Parisa Ghodous and Geilson Loureiro), Leading the Web in concurrent engineering : next generation concurrent engineering

See also

Bibliography 
  Pierre Le Hir, « Rose Dieng. Un cerveau sans frontières », Le Monde, 12 janvier 2006

External links
  Portrait a profile of Rose Dieng-Kuntz on the Website of INRIA.
  Rose Dieng-Kuntz : savoir, mémoire et partage
  Hommage à Rose Dieng (avec article revue des anciens X polytechniciens), site Fondation C.Génial
   Biography of Rose Dieng-Kuntz

References

1956 births
2008 deaths
Senegalese women computer scientists
Artificial intelligence researchers
20th-century women scientists
Senegalese expatriates in France
École Polytechnique alumni